The British Osteopathic Association (BOA) was an independent organisation representing osteopaths. In July 2014, the BOA became the Institute of Osteopathy, with a focus on improving public health and patient care.

References

External links 
 

Osteopathic medical associations
Osteopathy in the United Kingdom
Medical and health organisations based in the United Kingdom
Organizations established in 1998
1998 establishments in the United Kingdom